Autosticha shexianica is a moth in the family Autostichidae. It was described by S.X. Wang in 2004. It is found in China (Hebei).

References

Moths described in 2004
Autosticha
Moths of Asia